Bohdana Yosypivna Durda (born May 24, 1940) is a Ukrainian artist, writer, poet, and songwriter, as well as a former design engineer. Her artwork includes portraits, landscapes, and still lifes. She has illustrated children's books, and has written lyrics for more than 100 songs.

Biography
Bohdana Yosypivna Durda was born in Buchach, Chortkiv Raion of Ternopil Oblast in Western Ukraine, May 24, 1940.

In 1965, she graduated from Lviv Polytechnic, and in 1991, from the Moscow Correspondence University of Arts.

From 1965 till 1996, Durda worked as a design engineer at the Ternopil Combine Plant, a chemical plant in Donetsk. Since 2003, she has been teaching at Ternopil Secondary School No. 24 and the Malvy Cultural and Art Center.

Durda has focused on her creative work since 1996, including portraits, landscapes, and still lifes, but has participated in art exhibitions since 1979. She has had solo exhibitions in Ternopil in 1997, 2003, and 2007), and in Buchach (2006). 

She created illustrations for Marta Chopik's children's book, А що бачать очка (And What the Glasses See), as well as for her own books: На грані: Вірші, пісні (On the Verge: Poems, Songs) (2001), іка життя: Поеми, поезії (River of Life: Poems, Poetry) (2003), and Лабіринти долі (Labyrinths of Fate) (2006; all — Тернопіль).

Durda was a participant in the All-Ukrainian festival of author's songs "Oberig-93" in Lutsk. She has written lyrics for more than 100 songs.

Selected works

Works of art
 Квіти (Flowers) (1991)
 Старий парк (Old Park) (1994)
 Польові квіти (Wildflowers) (1995)
 К. Білокур (K. Bilokur) (1996)
 Над греблею (Over the Dam) (1998)
 Після концерту (С. Крушельницька) (After the Concert (S. Krushelnytska)) (2000)
 М. Башкирцева (M. Bashkirtseva) (2002)
 Осінь (Autumn) (2003)

Literature
 Гриб А. Барвисті джерела. Т., 1998
 Na hrani, 2001
 Rika z︠h︡ytt︠i︡a: poemy, poeziï, 2003

References

Sources
 Demyanova I., Shcherbak L. Durda Bohdana Yosypivna // Ternopil encyclopedic dictionary: in 4 volumes / editor: G. Yavorsky and others. - Ternopil: Publishing and Printing Plant "Zbruch", 2010. - Vol. 4: A - I (additional). - P. 219. - ISBN 978-966-528-318-8. (in Ukrainian)

1940 births
Living people
People from Buchach
Lviv Polytechnic alumni
20th-century Ukrainian engineers
20th-century Ukrainian women artists
21st-century Ukrainian women artists
20th-century Ukrainian poets
21st-century Ukrainian poets
20th-century Ukrainian women writers
21st-century Ukrainian women writers
Ukrainian songwriters
Ukrainian women poets
Design engineering